John Talman  (July 1677, King's Street, Westminster – 3 November 1726, London) was a British antiquary and art collector.  He was the eldest son of William Talman and his wife Hannah.  From 1709 to 1717 he toured in Italy, collecting antiquities, becoming friends with the antiquarian pope Clement XI and enjoying the freedom to practice his Catholicism.  On his return, he was a founder-member of the Society of Antiquaries of London.

External links
. 

1677 births
1726 deaths
English antiquarians
English art collectors
English Roman Catholics
People from Westminster